An annular solar eclipse occurred on September 7, 1820. A solar eclipse occurs when the Moon passes between Earth and the Sun, thereby totally or partly obscuring the image of the Sun for a viewer on Earth. An annular solar eclipse occurs when the Moon's apparent diameter is smaller than the Sun's, blocking most of the Sun's light and causing the Sun to look like an annulus (ring). An annular eclipse appears as a partial eclipse over a region of the Earth thousands of kilometres wide.

Observation and prediction

This map was drawn in the book Elementa eclipsium, published in Prague in 1816, by Franz Ignaz Cassian Hallaschka (František Ignác Kassián Halaška) (1780-1847), contained maps of the paths of solar eclipses from 1816 and 1860. The geometric constructions used by Hallaschka anticipated the standard theory of eclipses later developed by Friedrich Wilhelm Bessel.

Related eclipses 
It is a part of solar Saros 122.

Notes

References

 NASA chart graphics
 Googlemap
 NASA Besselian elements
 

1820 9 7
1820 in science
1820 9 7
September 1820 events